Justin Thomas Pawlak, also known as JTP, is an American professional drifter who currently competes in the Formula D series.  He earned his Formula D Professional license in 2006 and later earned his D1 license.  In 2010, he was picked up Team Falken Tire and has been with them ever since.  For the 2012 FD Season, he drives the 2013 Falken Tire Ford Mustang RTR.  Justin continues his support of local, grassroots drifting by judging the Just Drift Top Drift series alongside fellow Formula D drivers Taka Aono and Hiro Sumida.

Quick Facts

Justin Thomas Pawlak
 Nickname - JTP
 Height – 6’ 0”
 Weight – 195 lbs
 Car Number – 13
 Hometown – Kalamazoo, MI
 Team – Falken Tire Motorsports
 Crew Members – Rick lamber, Sergio Ramirez, Chris Tuscow, Eric Ross, Dalton Folkert, Tim Folkert, Stan Williams

2013 Falken Tire Ford Mustang Specs
 Tires – Falken Azenis RT-615K
 Engine – Ford Racing/Roush Yates engine
 Horsepower – 865 hp/632 ft lbs tq
 Suspension – RTS
 Brakes – Wilwood
 Wheels – HRE Performance Wheels Competition Series C106
 Exterior – Dry carbon panels
 Interior – Sparco safety equipment

Sponsors
 Falken Tires
 Ford Racing
 Roush Performance
 Mobil 1
 RTS
 HRE Performance Wheels
 Wilwood
 Mothers
 BC
 Battery Tender
 HPI Racing
 Sparco
 3d carbon
 HPI Racing
 GoPro
 Falken Team

Cars Driven
 2008 Season - Mazda RX-7 FC Turbo Rotary
 2010–present - Falken Tire Ford Mustang

Achievements

2012 Finished 4th Overall (501 pts)
 Placed 1st at Formula Drift Round 1, Streets of Long Beach, CA (Qualified 4th)
 Placed 1st at Formula Drift Round 2, Road Atlanta Raceway, GA (Qualified 8th)
 Placed 4th at Formula Drift Round 3, Palm Beach International Raceway, FL
 Placed Top 8 at Formula Drift Round 4, The Wall, NJ (Qualified 14th)
 Placed Top 32 at Formula Drift Round 5, Evergreen Speedway, WA (Qualified 2nd)
 Placed Top 32 at Formula Drift Round 6, Las Vegas Motor Speedway, NV (Qualified 9th)
 Placed 2nd at Formula Drift Round 7, Irwindale Speedway, CA (Qualified 2nd)
 2012 Triple Crown Champion

2011 
 Placed 2nd overall in the Formula D series (522.25 points)
 Placed 1st at Formula Drift Round 1, Streets of Long Beach, CA
 Placed 1st at Formula Drift Round 3, Palm Beach International Raceway, FL
 Placed 2nd at Formula Drift Round 4, Wall Speedway, NJ

2010 
 Placed 11th overall in the Formula D series (354.50 points)

2009 
 Placed 9th overall in the Formula D series (416 points)

2008 
 Formula D Championship - 16th Overall (197 pts)
 Placed Top 16 at Formula Drift Round 1, Streets of Long Beach, CA
 Placed Top 16 at Formula Drift Round 5, Evergreen Speedway, WA
 Placed 3rd at Formula Drift Round 7, Irwindale Speedway, CA
 Placed 1st at FD Monterrey Mexico Invitational

2006 
 Placed 1st at JustDrift Top Drift Championship Series

Other Appearances

References

External links
Justin Pawlak Official Website
Falken Tire Driver Profile
Formula D Driver Profile
FROM SOCCER TO ‘STANGS: THE MAKING OF JTP
JUSTIN PAWLAK WINS FORMULA DRIFT ATLANTA
FORMULA DRIFT LONG BEACH>> A CONVERSATION WITH JTP
5 Question Interview with Justin Pawlak – New 2010 Mustang and More

Living people
Drifting drivers
D1 Grand Prix drivers
Formula D drivers
Sportspeople from Kalamazoo, Michigan
Racing drivers from Michigan

1979 births